What's New, Tomboy is a studio album by American singer-songwriter Damien Jurado. It was released on May 1, 2020 under Mama Bird Recording Co.

Critical reception
What's New, Tomboy was met with generally favorable reviews from critics. At Metacritic, which assigns a weighted average rating out of 100 to reviews from mainstream publications, this release received an average score of 78, based on 13 reviews.

Track listing

References

2020 albums
Damien Jurado albums